Heteropogon may refer to:

 Heteropogon (plant), genus of tussock grass in the family Poaceae
 Heteropogon (fly), genus of robber flies in the family Asilidae